James Ellingson (born May 18, 1963) is a former Canadian Football League slotback for the Saskatchewan Roughriders and the Ottawa Rough Riders from 1986 through 1996, including winning the 77th Grey Cup in 1989. He now co-hosts Pre/Post game Ottawa Redblacks Football coverage on TSN 1200 but often loses at Match Game.

References

 Bio
Career stats

1963 births
Living people
Canadian football slotbacks
Players of Canadian football from Alberta
Ottawa Rough Riders players
Saskatchewan Roughriders players
Canadian football people from Calgary
UBC Thunderbirds football players